Esteban Becker Churukián (born 31 August 1964) is an Argentine football manager and former player. He currently manages Tercera División RFEF club CD Torrijos.

Early life 
Becker was born in Bernal, Buenos Aires to Argentine parents – a Jewish father of German descent and a Christian mother of Armenian descent.

Club career 
Becker played in the youth ranks for Independiente from 1974 to 1984. He played professionally with Quilmes and with Ciempozuelos and Loeches and even an offer from Atletico de Madrid in 1989. Due to his Jewish roots, he represented his country at 1989 Maccabiah Games in Israel, winning a silver medal.

Managerial career 
After coaching a number of clubs in Spanish lower divisions, Becker signed as the coach of Equatorial Guinea women's team in 2012. He won the 2012 African Women's Championship which the country hosted. In 2013, he was appointed as the technical director of all the three national sides of Equatorial Guinea.. In January 2015, he was appointed as the manager of Equatorial Guinea, three weeks before the 2015 Africa Cup of Nations.

References

External links 
 
 

1964 births
Living people
People from Quilmes Partido
Sportspeople from Buenos Aires Province
Argentine footballers
Association football midfielders
Maccabiah Games competitors for Argentina
Maccabiah Games silver medalists for Argentina
Competitors at the 1989 Maccabiah Games
Maccabiah Games medalists in football
Argentine football managers
Women's association football managers
Equatorial Guinea women's national football team managers
Equatorial Guinea national football team managers
2015 Africa Cup of Nations managers
Argentine expatriate football managers
Argentine expatriates in Equatorial Guinea
Expatriate football managers in Equatorial Guinea
Argentine people of German-Jewish descent
Argentine people of Armenian descent
Argentine sportspeople of Armenian descent
Argentine emigrants to Spain
Naturalised citizens of Spain
RSD Alcalá managers
CF Fuenlabrada managers
Tercera División managers
Tercera Federación managers